Bil Spring  or Kani Bil is a natural spring in the Hewraman region in Iran. Bill Spring is the biggest spring in western parts of Iran. It is of very significant cultural value to the Hewrami people and there are many references to it in their culture, identity and Literature. However, it is in danger of annihilation because of construction of the "Daryan" dam nearby. The river that is formed by this fountain is 15m long, making it the shortest river in the world.

References

Springs of Iran